The 2017 UEFA European Under-21 Championship (also known as UEFA Under-21 Euro 2017) was the 21st edition of the UEFA European Under-21 Championship, a biennial international youth football championship organised by UEFA for the men's under-21 national teams of Europe. The final tournament was hosted in Poland for the first time, after their bid was selected by the UEFA Executive Committee on 26 January 2015 in Nyon, Switzerland. The tournament took place from 16–30 June 2017. Players born on or after 1 January 1994 were eligible for the tournament.

In March 2012, UEFA announced that the competition would take place in even numbered years from 2016 onwards. In September 2013, UEFA announced its intention to continue holding the final tournament in odd numbered years following a request from its member national football associations. On 24 January 2014, UEFA confirmed that the final tournament would be held in 2017 and that it would be expanded from 8 teams to 12.

Hosts
The hosts were announced at a meeting of the UEFA Executive Committee in Nyon on 26 January 2015. In late April 2014, the Polish Football Association very strongly indicated the country has high chances to host the tournament. Bidding to welcome Europe's best youth teams was one of the reasons for Poland's withdrawal from the UEFA Euro 2020 race.

Qualification

A total of 53 UEFA nations entered the competition (Gibraltar did not enter, as per usual), and with the hosts Poland qualifying automatically, the other 52 teams competed in the qualifying competition to determine the remaining 11 spots in the final tournament. The qualifying competition, which took place from March 2015 to November 2016, consisted of two rounds:
Qualifying group stage: The 52 teams are drawn into nine groups – seven groups of six teams and two groups of five teams. Each group is played in home-and-away round-robin format. The nine group winners qualify directly for the final tournament, while the four best runners-up (not counting results against the sixth-placed team) advance to the play-offs.
Play-offs: The four teams are drawn into two ties to play home-and-away two-legged matches to determine the last two qualified teams.

Qualified teams
The following 12 teams qualified for the final tournament.

Note: All appearance statistics include only U-21 era (since 1978).

Final draw
The final draw was held on 1 December 2016, 18:00 CET (UTC+1), at the ICE Congress Centre in Kraków. The 12 teams were drawn into three groups of four teams. The teams were seeded according to their coefficient ranking following the end of the qualifying play-offs, with the hosts Poland assigned to position A1 in the draw. Each group contained either the hosts or one team from Pot 1, one team from Pot 2, and two teams from Pot 3.

Venues
On 7 June 2016, Polish Football Association selected six venues:

Match officials
In February 2017, UEFA selected nine referees and their teams for this tournament.

 4th officials:

Squads

Each national team had to submit a squad of 23 players, three of whom had to be goalkeepers. If a player was injured or ill severely enough to prevent his participation in the tournament before his team's first match, he could be replaced by another player.

Group stage
The group winners and the best runner-up advanced to the semi-finals.

Tiebreakers
Teams were ranked according to points (3 points for a win, 1 point for a draw, 0 points for a loss), and if tied on points, the following tiebreaking criteria were applied, in the order given, to determine the rankings (Regulations Articles 18.01 and 18.02):
Points in head-to-head matches among tied teams;
Goal difference in head-to-head matches among tied teams;
Goals scored in head-to-head matches among tied teams;
If more than two teams are tied, and after applying all head-to-head criteria above, a subset of teams are still tied, all head-to-head criteria above are reapplied exclusively to this subset of teams;
Goal difference in all group matches;
Goals scored in all group matches;
Penalty shoot-out if only two teams had the same number of points, and they met in the last round of the group and are tied after applying all criteria above (not used if more than two teams had the same number of points, or if their rankings were not relevant for qualification for the next stage);
Disciplinary points (red card = 3 points, yellow card = 1 point, expulsion for two yellow cards in one match = 3 points);
UEFA coefficient for the final draw.

All times are local, CEST (UTC+2).

Group A

Group B

Group C

Ranking of second-placed teams

The match-ups of the semi-finals depended on which runner-up qualified (Regulations Article 17.02):

Knockout stage
In the knockout stage, extra time and a penalty shoot-out were used to decide the winner if necessary.

On 2 May 2016, the UEFA Executive Committee agreed that the competition would be part of the International Football Association Board's trial to allow a fourth substitute to be made during extra time.

Bracket

Semi-finals

Final

Goalscorers
There were 65 goals scored in 21 matches, for an average of  goals per match.

5 goals

 Saúl

3 goals

 Bruma
 Marco Asensio

2 goals

 Kenneth Zohore
 Demarai Gray
 Davie Selke
 Enis Bardhi
 Martin Chrien
 Federico Bernardeschi

1 goal

 Tomáš Chorý
 Marek Havlík
 Michael Lüftner
 Patrik Schick
 Michal Trávník
 Lucas Andersen
 Marcus Ingvartsen
 Tammy Abraham
 Lewis Baker
 Alfie Mawson
 Jacob Murphy
 Nathan Redmond
 Nadiem Amiri
 Serge Gnabry
 Marc-Oliver Kempf
 Max Meyer
 Felix Platte
 Mitchell Weiser
 Domenico Berardi
 Lorenzo Pellegrini
 Andrea Petagna
 Nikola Gjorgjev
 Kire Markoski
 Dawid Kownacki
 Patryk Lipski
 Łukasz Moneta
 Bruno Fernandes
 Gonçalo Guedes
 Edgar Ié
 Daniel Podence
 Uroš Đurđević
 Mijat Gaćinović
 Jaroslav Mihalík
 Pavol Šafranko
 Ľubomír Šatka
 Martin Valjent
 Gerard Deulofeu
 Sandro
 Iñaki Williams
 Denis Suárez
 Jacob Une Larsson
 Carlos Strandberg

Awards
The following awards were given at the conclusion of the tournament:
Player of the Tournament:  Dani Ceballos
Golden Boot:  Saúl

Team of the tournament
After the tournament, the Under-21 Team of the Tournament was selected by the UEFA Technical Observers.

Sponsorship

 Booking.com
 Cinkciarz
 Hisense
 Volkswagen

References

External links

UEFA Under-21 history: 2015/17
2017 finals: Poland, UEFA.com
UEFA Under-21 Championship Poland 2017 tournament website 

 
2017
Under-21 Championship
2017 Uefa European Under-21 Championship
2016–17 in Polish football
June 2017 sports events in Europe
2017 in youth association football